Faiq Lodhi better known by his stage name Lodhi or Lodhi Words, is a 2020 BBC Music Introducing desi hip hop artist.

Personal life
Lodhi was born in Bahawalpur, Pakistan and attended Sadiq Public School. He currently lives in Hertfordshire, UK.

Music career
Lodhi began writing poetry about his experience growing up in Bahawalpur. While living in the UK, Lodhi has been influenced by the current underground Grime scene.
 Lodhi is influenced by artists such as Nusrat Fateh Ali Khan, Nas. He's featured with artists such as Xpolymer Dar, Dialect, Illmatik, Sound Shikari, Hashim Nawaz, Ghauri, Hashim Ishaq, and DAKU.

Lodhi released his first EP, the Culture Shock in late summer 2020. The Culture Shock is a fusion of both UK and Desi cultures and received and numbered spot on the BBC Asian Network’s Pakistani Music charts.  Lodhi was featured on BBC Asian Network when his first track, "Jumma" was played as track of the week.

Discography

EP Albums

Singles

References

External links
 YouTube LodhiWords
 Artist Spotify

Pakistani music
Pakistani culture
Pakistani rappers
Punjabi rappers
Desi culture
British culture
Living people
Year of birth missing (living people)